Struznica may refer to:

 Strużnica, village in Lower Silesian Voivodeship, Poland
 Stružnica, settlement in the Municipality of Stružnica, Slovenia